Heart of the City is an American crime drama television series created by E. Arthur Kean and Michael Zinberg. The series aired on ABC from September 20, 1986 to January 10, 1987.

Premise
The series focuses on the duties of a police detective in a Los Angeles-styled city who also has to take care of his two teenaged children after his wife's murder (and how his colleagues on the force chastised him for making them look bad when he solved most of their cases). This was a production of American Flyer Productions in association with 20th Century Fox Television.

Cast
Robert Desiderio as Det. Wes Kennedy
Christina Applegate as Robin Kennedy
Jonathan Ward as Kevin Kennedy
Branscombe Richmond as Sgt. Luke Halui
Kario Salem as Det. Rick Arno 
Robert Alan Browne as Det. Stanley Bumford
Dick Anthony Williams as Lt. Ed Van Duzer

Episodes

Broadcast and reception

The series debuted on ABC's Saturday-night schedule in September 1986 (9pm ET/8pm CT), following two comedies: The Ellen Burstyn Show and Life with Lucy. It was the second lowest rated show that season, airing against NBC's The Golden Girls and Amen, and also losing out to CBS's The New Mike Hammer. Heart of the City ranked 82nd out of 83 shows, with a 7.2/12 rating/share.

References

Brooks, Tim and Marsh, Earle, "The Complete Directory to Prime Time Network and Cable TV Shows"

External links

1986 American television series debuts
1987 American television series endings
1980s American crime drama television series
1980s American police procedural television series
American Broadcasting Company original programming
Primetime Emmy Award-winning television series
Television series by 20th Century Fox Television
Television shows set in Los Angeles